Payment Guaranteed is a 1921 American silent drama film directed by George L. Cox and starring Margarita Fischer, Cecil Van Auker, and Hayward Mack.

Cast
 Margarita Fischer as Emily Heath 
 Cecil Van Auker as Stephen Strange 
 Hayward Mack as Harry Fenton 
 Harry Lonsdale as Jim Barton 
 Harvey Clark as Reporter 
 Marjorie Manners as Myrtle 
 Alice Wilson as Gertie

References

Bibliography
 St. Romain, Theresa. Margarita Fischer: A Biography of the Silent Film Star. McFarland, 2008.

External links

1921 films
1921 drama films
Silent American drama films
Films directed by George L. Cox
American silent feature films
1920s English-language films
Pathé Exchange films
American black-and-white films
1920s American films